Garaeus apicata is a moth in the  family Geometridae. It is found in the north-eastern Himalaya, Burma, Sumatra, Borneo and Taiwan.

The larvae have been recorded feeding on Gmelina arborea. They are brown.

Subspecies
Garaeus apicata apicata
Garaeus apicata formosanus Bastelberger, 1911 (Taiwan)

References

Moths described in 1868
Ourapterygini
Moths of Borneo
Moths of Indonesia
Moths of Asia
Moths of Taiwan